Strawberry cake is a cake that uses strawberry as a primary ingredient. Strawberries may be used in the cake batter, atop the cake, and in the frosting. Strawberry cakes are typically served cold.

Overview
Strawberry cakes may be prepared with strawberries in the batter, with strawberries atop them, with strawberries or a strawberry filling in between the layers of a layer cake, and in any combination thereof.  Some are prepared with strawberries incorporated into a frosting. Fresh or frozen strawberries may be used. Some may utilize strawberry-flavored gelatin as an ingredient, which can give the cake a pink color when it is mixed in with the batter. A garnish of strawberries is used on some strawberry cakes. Strawberry cake may be prepared as a gluten-free dish. 

Some versions are served chilled, and some are frozen and then served in a partially frozen state. Ricotta cheese is sometimes used as an ingredient in the cake batter or as a topping. Strawberry cake is sometimes prepared using a prepared cake mix as a base, such as a white cake mix, upon which additional ingredients are added to the batter or atop the cake. It is sometimes prepared and served as a dish on Valentine's Day.

Gallery

Philippines

La Trinidad, Benguet Strawberry Festival
On March 20, 2004 at the Strawberry Festival in the La Trinidad, Benguet municipality of the Philippines, the world's largest strawberry shortcake was prepared and confirmed by Guinness World Records. The cake was prepared by several bakers and weighed a total of 21,213.40 lb (9,622.23 kg).

In March 2015 at the La Trinidad Strawberry Festival, 6,000 slices of strawberry cake were served as part of the events. The cakes for the slices were prepared using fresh strawberries. Additional foods served at the event included strawberry cupcakes, strawberry kutsinta (a steamed rice cake) and strawberry wine. Some bakeries and restaurants purvey strawberry cake as a part of their fare.

See also

 List of cakes
 List of strawberry dishes
 List of strawberry topics

References

Further reading

 
 

Cakes
Strawberry dishes
Strawberry festivals
Frozen desserts
Valentine's Day